Technological determinism is a reductionist theory that assumes that a society's technology progresses by following its own internal logic of efficiency, while determining the development of the social structure and cultural values. The term is believed to have originated from Thorstein Veblen (1857–1929), an American sociologist and economist. The most radical technological determinist in the United States in the 20th century was most likely Clarence Ayres who was a follower of Thorstein Veblen and John Dewey. William Ogburn was also known for his radical technological determinism and his theory on cultural lag.

The first major elaboration of a technological determinist view of socioeconomic development came from the German philosopher and economist Karl Marx, who argued that changes in technology, and specifically productive technology, are the primary influence on human social relations and organizational structure, and that social relations and cultural practices ultimately revolve around the technological and economic base of a given society. Marx's position has become embedded in contemporary society, where the idea that fast-changing technologies alter human lives is pervasive. 
Although many authors attribute a technologically determined view of human history to Marx's insights, not all Marxists are technological determinists, and some authors question the extent to which Marx himself was a determinist. Furthermore, there are multiple forms of technological determinism.

Origin 

The term is believed to have been coined by Thorstein Veblen (1857–1929), an American social scientist. Veblen's contemporary, popular historian Charles A. Beard, provided this apt determinist image, "Technology marches in seven-league boots from one ruthless, revolutionary conquest to another, tearing down old factories and industries, flinging up new processes with terrifying rapidity." As to the meaning, it is described as the ascription to machines of "powers" that they do not have. Veblen, for instance, asserted that "the machine throws out anthropomorphic habits of thought." There is also the case of Karl Marx who expected that the construction of the railway in India would dissolve the caste system. The general idea, according to Robert Heilbroner, is that technology, by way of its machines, can cause historical change by changing the material conditions of human existence.

One of the most radical technological determinists was Clarence Ayres, who was a follower of Veblen's theory in the 20th century. Ayres is best known for developing economic philosophies, but he also worked closely with Veblen who coined the technological determinism theory. He often talked about the struggle between technology and ceremonial structure. One of his most notable theories involved the concept of "technological drag" where he explains technology as a self-generating process and institutions as ceremonial and this notion creates a technological over-determinism in the process.

Explanation 

Technological determinism seeks to show technical developments, media, or technology as a whole, as the key mover in history and social change. It is a theory subscribed to by "hyperglobalists" who claim that as a consequence of the wide availability of technology, accelerated globalization is inevitable. Therefore, technological development and innovation become the principal motor of social, economic or political change.

Strict adherents to technological determinism do not believe the influence of technology differs based on how much a technology is or can be used. Instead of considering technology as part of a larger spectrum of human activity, technological determinism sees technology as the basis for all human activity.

Technological determinism has been summarized as 'The belief in technology as a key governing force in society ...' (Merritt Roe Smith). 'The idea that technological development determines social change ...' (Bruce Bimber). It changes the way people think and how they interact with others and can be described as '...a three-word logical proposition: "Technology determines history"' (Rosalind H. Williams) . It is, '... the belief that social progress is driven by technological innovation, which in turn follows an "inevitable" course.' This 'idea of progress' or 'doctrine of progress' is centralised around the idea that social problems can be solved by technological advancement, and this is the way that society moves forward. Technological determinists believe that "'You can't stop progress', implying that we are unable to control technology" (Lelia Green). This suggests that we are somewhat powerless and society allows technology to drive social changes because, "societies fail to be aware of the alternatives to the values embedded in it [technology]" (Merritt Roe Smith).

Technological determinism has been defined as an approach that identifies technology, or technological advances, as the central causal element in processes of social change (Croteau and Hoynes). As a technology is stabilized, its design tends to dictate users' behaviors, consequently diminishing human agency. This stance however ignores the social and cultural circumstances in which the technology was developed. Sociologist Claude Fischer (1992) characterized the most prominent forms of technological determinism as "billiard ball" approaches, in which technology is seen as an external force introduced into a social situation, producing a series of ricochet effects.

Rather than acknowledging that a society or culture interacts with and even shapes the technologies that are used, a technological determinist view holds that "the uses made of technology are largely determined by the structure of the technology itself, that is, that its functions follow from its form" (Neil Postman). However, this is not to be confused with Daniel Chandler's "inevitability thesis", which states that once a technology is introduced into a culture that what follows is the inevitable development of that technology.

For example, we could examine why Romance Novels have become so dominant in our society compared to other forms of novels like the Detective or Western novel. We might say that it was because of the invention of the perfect binding system developed by publishers. This was where glue was used instead of the time-consuming and very costly process of binding books by sewing in separate signatures. This meant that these books could be mass-produced for the wider public. We would not be able to have mass literacy without mass production. This example is closely related to Marshall McLuhan's belief that print helped produce the nation state. This moved society on from an oral culture to a literate culture but also introduced a capitalist society where there was clear class distinction and individualism. As Postman maintains  

The printing press, the computer, and television are not therefore simply machines which convey information. They are metaphors through which we conceptualize reality in one way or another. They will classify the world for us, sequence it, frame it, enlarge it, reduce it, argue a case for what it is like. Through these media metaphors, we do not see the world as it is. We see it as our coding systems are. Such is the power of the form of information.

Hard and soft determinism 

In examining determinism, hard determinism can be contrasted with soft determinism. A compatibilist says that it is possible for free will and determinism to exist in the world together, while an incompatibilist would say that they can not and there must be one or the other. Those who support determinism can be further divided.

Hard determinists would view technology as developing independent from social concerns. They would say that technology creates a set of powerful forces acting to regulate our social activity and its meaning. According to this view of determinism we organize ourselves to meet the needs of technology and the outcome of this organization is beyond our control or we do not have the freedom to make a choice regarding the outcome (autonomous technology). The 20th century French philosopher and social theorist Jacques Ellul could be said to be a hard determinist and proponent of autonomous technique (technology). In his 1954 work The Technological Society, Ellul essentially posits that technology, by virtue of its power through efficiency, determines which social aspects are best suited for its own development through a process of natural selection. A social system's values, morals, philosophy etc. that are most conducive to the advancement of technology allow that social system to enhance its power and spread at the expense of those social systems whose values, morals, philosophy etc. are less promoting of technology. While geography, climate, and other "natural" factors largely determined the parameters of social conditions for most of human history, technology has recently become the dominant objective factor (largely due to forces unleashed by the industrial revolution) and it has been the principal objective and determining factor.

Soft determinism, as the name suggests, is a more passive view of the way technology interacts with socio-political situations. Soft determinists still subscribe to the fact that technology is the guiding force in our evolution, but would maintain that we have a chance to make decisions regarding the outcomes of a situation. This is not to say that free will exists, but that the possibility for us to roll the dice and see what the outcome is exists. A slightly different variant of soft determinism is the 1922 technology-driven theory of social change proposed by William Fielding Ogburn, in which society must adjust to the consequences of major inventions, but often does so only after a period of cultural lag.

Technology as neutral 

Individuals who consider technology as neutral see technology as neither good nor bad and what matters are the ways in which we use technology. An example of a neutral viewpoint is, "guns are neutral and its up to how we use them whether it would be 'good or bad'" (Green, 2001). Mackenzie and Wajcman believe that technology is neutral only if it's never been used before, or if no one knows what it is going to be used for (Green, 2001). In effect, guns would be classified as neutral if and only if society were none the wiser of their existence and functionality (Green, 2001). Obviously, such a society is non-existent and once becoming knowledgeable about technology, the society is drawn into a social progression where nothing is 'neutral about society' (Green). According to Lelia Green, if one believes technology is neutral, one would disregard the cultural and social conditions that technology has produced (Green, 2001). This view is also referred to as technological instrumentalism.

In what is often considered a definitive reflection on the topic, the historian Melvin Kranzberg famously wrote in the first of his six laws of technology: "Technology is neither good nor bad; nor is it neutral."

Criticism 
Skepticism about technological determinism emerged alongside increased pessimism about techno-science in the mid-20th century, in particular around the use of nuclear energy in the production of nuclear weapons, Nazi human experimentation during World War II, and the problems of economic development in the Third World. As a direct consequence, desire for greater control of the course of development of technology gave rise to disenchantment with the model of technological determinism in academia.

Modern theorists of technology and society no longer consider technological determinism to be a very accurate view of the way in which we interact with technology, even though determinist assumptions and language fairly saturate the writings of many boosters of technology, the business pages of many popular magazines, and much reporting on technology . Instead, research in science and technology studies, social construction of technology and related fields have emphasised more nuanced views that resist easy causal formulations. They emphasise that "The relationship between technology and society cannot be reduced to a simplistic cause-and-effect formula. It is, rather, an 'intertwining'", whereby technology does not determine but "operates, and are operated upon in a complex social field" (Murphie and Potts).

T. Snyder approached the aspect of technological determinism in his concept: 'politics of inevitability'. A concept utilized by politicians in which society is promised the idea that the future will be only more of the present, this concept removes responsibility. This could be applied to free markets, the development of nation states and technological progress.

In his article "Subversive Rationalization: Technology, Power and Democracy with Technology," Andrew Feenberg argues that technological determinism is not a very well founded concept by illustrating that two of the founding theses of determinism are easily questionable and in doing so calls for what he calls democratic rationalization (Feenberg 210–212).

Prominent opposition to technologically determinist thinking has emerged within work on the social construction of technology (SCOT). SCOT research, such as that of Mackenzie and Wajcman (1997) argues that the path of innovation and its social consequences are strongly, if not entirely shaped by society itself through the influence of culture, politics, economic arrangements, regulatory mechanisms and the like. In its strongest form, verging on social determinism, "What matters is not the technology itself, but the social or economic system in which it is embedded" (Langdon Winner).

In his influential but contested (see Woolgar and Cooper, 1999) article "Do Artifacts Have Politics?", Langdon Winner illustrates not a form of determinism but the various sources of the politics of technologies. Those politics can stem from the intentions of the designer and the culture of the society in which a technology emerges or can stem from the technology itself, a "practical necessity" for it to function. For instance, New York City urban planner Robert Moses is purported to have built Long Island's parkway tunnels too low for buses to pass in order to keep minorities away from the island's beaches, an example of externally inscribed politics. On the other hand, an authoritarian command-and-control structure is a practical necessity of a nuclear power plant if radioactive waste is not to fall into the wrong hands. As such, Winner neither succumbs to technological determinism nor social determinism. The source of a technology's politics is determined only by carefully examining its features and history.

Although "The deterministic model of technology is widely propagated in society" (Sarah Miller), it has also been widely questioned by scholars. Lelia Green explains that, "When technology was perceived as being outside society, it made sense to talk about technology as neutral". Yet, this idea fails to take into account that culture is not fixed and society is dynamic. When "Technology is implicated in social processes, there is nothing neutral about society" (Lelia Green). This confirms one of the major problems with "technological determinism and the resulting denial of human responsibility for change. There is a loss of human involvement that shape technology and society" (Sarah Miller).

Another conflicting idea is that of technological somnambulism, a term coined by Winner in his essay "Technology as Forms of Life". Winner wonders whether or not we are simply sleepwalking through our existence with little concern or knowledge as to how we truly interact with technology. In this view, it is still possible for us to wake up and once again take control of the direction in which we are traveling (Winner 104). However, it requires society to adopt Ralph Schroeder's claim that, "users don't just passively consume technology, but actively transform it".

In opposition to technological determinism are those who subscribe to the belief of social determinism and postmodernism. Social determinists believe that social circumstances alone select which technologies are adopted, with the result that no technology can be considered "inevitable" solely on its own merits. Technology and culture are not neutral and when knowledge comes into the equation, technology becomes implicated in social processes. The knowledge of how to create and enhance technology, and of how to use technology is socially bound knowledge. Postmodernists take another view, suggesting that what is right or wrong is dependent on circumstance. They believe technological change can have implications on the past, present and future. While they believe technological change is influenced by changes in government policy, society and culture, they consider the notion of change to be a paradox, since change is constant.

Media and cultural studies theorist Brian Winston, in response to technological determinism, developed a model for the emergence of new technologies which is centered on the Law of the suppression of radical potential. In two of his books – Technologies of Seeing: Photography, Cinematography and Television (1997) and Media Technology and Society (1998) – Winston applied this model to show how technologies evolve over time, and how their 'invention' is mediated and controlled by society and societal factors which suppress the radical potential of a given technology.

The stirrup

One continued argument for technological determinism is centered on the stirrup and its impact on the creation of feudalism in Europe in the late 8th century/early 9th century. Lynn White is credited with first drawing this parallel between feudalism and the stirrup in his book Medieval Technology and Social Change, which was published in 1962 and argued that as "it made possible mounted shock combat", the new form of war made the soldier that much more efficient in supporting feudal townships (White, 2). According to White, the superiority of the stirrup in combat was found in the mechanics of the lance charge: "The stirrup made possible- though it did not demand- a vastly more effective mode of attack: now the rider could law his lance at rest, held between the upper arm and the body, and make at his foe, delivering the blow not with his muscles but with the combined weight of himself and his charging stallion (White, 2)." White draws from a large research base, particularly Heinrich Brunner's "Der Reiterdienst und die Anfänge des Lehnwesens" in substantiating his claim of the emergence of feudalism. In focusing on the evolution of warfare, particularly that of cavalry in connection with Charles Martel's "diversion of a considerable part of the Church's vast military riches...from infantry to cavalry", White draws from Brunner's research and identifies the stirrup as the underlying cause for such a shift in military division and the subsequent emergence of feudalism (White, 4). Under the new brand of warfare garnered from the stirrup, White implicitly argues in favor of technological determinism as the vehicle by which feudalism was created.

Though an accomplished work, White's Medieval Technology and Social Change has since come under heavy scrutiny and condemnation. The most volatile critics of White's argument at the time of its publication, P.H. Sawyer and R.H. Hilton, call the work as a whole "a misleading adventurist cast to old-fashioned platitudes with a chain of obscure and dubious deductions from scanty evidence about the progress of technology (Sawyer and Hilton, 90)." They further condemn his methods and, by association, the validity of technological determinism: "Had Mr. White been prepared to accept the view that the English and Norman methods of fighting were not so very different in the eleventh century, he would have made the weakness of his argument less obvious, but the fundamental failure would remain: the stirrup cannot alone explain the changes it made possible (Sawyer and Hilton, 91)." For Sawyer and Hilton, though the stirrup may be useful in the implementation of feudalism, it cannot be credited for the creation of feudalism alone.

Despite the scathing review of White's claims, the technological determinist aspect of the stirrup is still in debate. Alex Roland, author of "Once More into the Stirrups; Lynne White Jr, Medieval Technology and Social Change", provides an intermediary stance: not necessarily lauding White's claims, but providing a little defense against Sawyer and Hilton's allegations of gross intellectual negligence. Roland views White's focus on technology to be the most relevant and important aspect of Medieval Technology and Social Change rather than the particulars of its execution: "But can these many virtues, can this utility for historians of technology, outweigh the most fundamental standards of the profession? Can historians of technology continue to read and assign a book that is, in the words of a recent critic, "shot through with over-simplification, with a progression of false connexions between cause and effect, and with evidence presented selectively to fit with [White's] own pre-conceived ideas"? The answer, I think, is yes, at least a qualified yes (Roland, 574-575)." Objectively, Roland claims Medieval Technology and Social Change a variable success, at least as "Most of White's argument stands... the rest has sparked useful lines of research (Roland, 584)." This acceptance of technological determinism is ambiguous at best, neither fully supporting the theory at large nor denouncing it, rather placing the construct firmly in the realm of the theoretical. Roland neither views technological determinism as completely dominant over history nor completely absent as well; in accordance with the above criterion of technological determinist structure, would Roland be classified as a "soft determinist".

Notable technological determinists 

Thomas L. Friedman, American journalist, columnist and author, admits to being a technological determinist in his book The World Is Flat.

Futurist Raymond Kurzweil's theories about a technological singularity follow a technologically deterministic view of history.

Some interpret Karl Marx as advocating technological determinism, with such statements as "The Handmill gives you society with the feudal lord: the steam-mill, society with the industrial capitalist" (The Poverty of Philosophy, 1847), but others argue that Marx was not a determinist.

Technological determinist Walter J. Ong reviews the societal transition from an oral culture to a written culture in his work Orality and Literacy: The Technologizing of the Word (1982). He asserts that this particular development is attributable to the use of new technologies of literacy (particularly print and writing,) to communicate thoughts which could previously only be verbalized. He furthers this argument by claiming that writing is purely context dependent as it is a "secondary modelling system" (8). Reliant upon the earlier primary system of spoken language, writing manipulates the potential of language as it depends purely upon the visual sense to communicate the intended information. Furthermore, the rather stagnant technology of literacy distinctly limits the usage and influence of knowledge, it unquestionably effects the evolution of society. In fact, Ong asserts that "more than any other single invention, writing has transformed human consciousness" (Ong 1982: 78).

Media determinism as a form of technological determinism 

Media determinism is a form of technological determinism, a philosophical and sociological position which posits the power of the media to impact society. Two foundational media determinists are the Canadian scholars Harold Innis and Marshall McLuhan. One of the best examples of technological determinism in media theory is Marshall McLuhan's theory "the medium is the message" and the ideas of his mentor Harold Adams Innis. Both these Canadian theorists saw media as the essence of civilization. The association of different media with particular mental consequences by McLuhan and others can be seen as related to technological determinism. It is this variety of determinism that is referred to as media determinism. According to McLuhan, there is an association between communications media/technology and language; similarly, Benjamin Lee Whorf argues that language shapes our perception of thinking (linguistic determinism). For McLuhan, media is a more powerful and explicit determinant than is the more general concept of language. McLuhan was not necessarily a hard determinist. As a more moderate version of media determinism, he proposed that our use of particular media may have subtle influences on us, but more importantly, it is the social context of use that is crucial. See also Media ecology.
Media determinism is a form of the popular dominant theory of the relationship between technology and society. In a determinist view, technology takes on an active life of its own and is seen be as a driver of social phenomena. Innis believed that the social, cultural, political, and economic developments of each historical period can be related directly to the technology of the means of mass communication of that period. In this sense, like Dr. Frankenstein's monster, technology itself appears to be alive, or at least capable of shaping human behavior. However, it has been increasingly subject to critical review by scholars. For example, scholar Raymond Williams, criticizes media determinism and rather believes social movements define technological and media processes. With regard to communications media, audience determinism is a viewpoint opposed to media determinism. This is described as instead of media being presented as doing things to people; the stress is on the way people do things with media. Individuals need to be aware that the term "deterministic" is a negative one for many social scientists and modern sociologists; in particular they often use the word as a term of abuse.

See also

Instrumental conception of technology
Compatibilism and incompatibilism
Democratic Rationalization
Democratic Transhumanism
Determinism
Digital surveillance
Hegemony
Historical materialism
 History of science and technology
Orthodox Marxism
Philosophy of technology
Social constructivism
Social engineering (political science)
Social shaping of technology
Sociocultural evolution
Technological fix
Technological somnambulism
Technological unemployment
Technological utopianism
Theory of productive forces

Footnotes
[as cited in Croteau, D. and Hoynes, M. (2003) Media Society: Industries, Images and Audiences (third edition), Pine Forge Press, Thousand Oaks pp. 305–306]

References

Further reading
G.A. Cohen, Karl Marx's Theory of History: A Defence, Oxford and Princeton, 1978.

Huesemann, Michael H., and Joyce A. Huesemann (2011). Technofix: Why Technology Won't Save Us or the Environment, New Society Publishers, Gabriola Island, British Columbia, Canada, 464 pp.

Ong, Walter J (1982). Orality and Literacy: The Technologizing of the Word. New York: Methuen.

Roland, Alex. Once More into the Stirrups; Lynne White Jr, Medieval Technology and Social Change" Classics Revisited. 574- 585.
Sawyer, P.H. and R.H. Hilton. "Technical Determinism" Past & Present. April 1963: 90-100. 

Winner, Langdon. "Technology as Forms of Life". Readings in the Philosophy of Technology. David M. Kaplan. Oxford: Rowman & Littlefield, 2004. 103–113
Woolgar, Steve and Cooper, Geoff (1999). "Do artefacts have ambivalence? Moses' bridges, Winner's bridges and other urban legends in S&TS". Social Studies of Science  29 (3), 433–449.

Furbank, P.N. "The Myth of Determinism." Raritan. [City] Fall 2006: 79–87. EBSCOhost. Monroe Community College Library, Rochester, NY. 2 April 2007.
Feenberg, Andrew. "Democratic Rationalization". Readings in the Philosophy of Technology. David M. Kaplan. Oxford: Rowman & Littlefield, 2004. 209–225
Chandler, Daniel. Technological or Media Determinism. 1995. 18 September 1995. <http://www.aber.ac.uk/media/Documents/tecdet/tecdet.html>

External links
Colin Rule, "Is Technology Neutral?"
Megan McCormick, "Technology as Neutral"
Daniel Chandler, "Technological or Media Determinism"
Chris Kimble, "Technological Determinism and Social Choice"

Determinism
History of technology
Philosophy of technology
Reductionism
Science and technology studies
Sociology of scientific knowledge
Marxist theory
Historical determinism
Technological change
Thorstein Veblen
Technology
Technology systems